The Ondatra class Soviet designation Project 1176 Akula ("shark") is a class of landing craft built for the Soviet Navy and Russian Navy between 1971 and 2009.

Construction
The vessels were built by the Azovskiy Shipyard, Rybinsk Shipyard and Vladivostok Shipyard. Over 40 vessels of this type were built for service with the Soviet and Russian navies, and additional vessels were built for export. The vessels are designated as type DKA Desantanyy Kater and are similar in type to the US Navy Landing Craft Mechanized (LCM).

The Ondatra landing craft have a limited range (2-day) and have a shallow draught that make them ideal for amphibious operations and littoral combat. The  carries one Ondatra for use as a tug for its  air-cushioned landing craft.

Although still under construction in 2009, the Project 1176 is a 1970s design that is reaching the end of its operational life. The class may be replaced by the newer Project 21820  that is currently entering service in the Russian Navy. The Dyugon-class vessels carry two main battle tanks compared to the Ondatra's single tank, it is armed (2 MPTU-1 of 14.5 mm), and can attain  compared to the Ondatra's .

Ships
42 vessels are documented for the Soviet Navy and Russian Navy.

See also
 List of ships of Russia by project number

References

External links
 Project 1176 landing craft (English)

Cold War naval ships of the Soviet Union
Amphibious warfare vessels of the Soviet Navy
Amphibious warfare vessels of the Russian Navy
Landing craft